On August 9, 2008 in the People's Republic of China, two American tourists and their Chinese tour guide were stabbed at the historic Beijing Drum Tower; one of the tourists was killed. The assailant then committed suicide by jumping from the tower. The incident occurred during the 2008 Summer Olympics in Beijing. The incident has been described as isolated since attacks on foreigners while visiting China are rare.

Stabbing attack

Three people were stabbed in Beijing, China, on August 9, 2008, by 47-year-old Tang Yongming of Hangzhou, while visiting the 13th-century Drum Tower in Beijing during the 2008 Summer Olympics.

The victims were Todd Bachman, a prominent horticulturalist from Lakeville, Minnesota, his wife Barbara, and their female Chinese national tour guide. Todd Bachman, who died in the attack, was the father of American athlete Elisabeth Bachman and the father-in-law of Team USA men's volleyball coach Hugh McCutcheon. Barbara Bachman was severely wounded but survived the attack. The female Chinese tour guide was listed in stable condition at the Chinese hospital, as was Mrs. Bachman. One of the Bachmans' daughters, Elisabeth Bachman McCutcheon, was also on the tour but was uninjured.

Perpetrator 
Tang Yongming spent most of his life in the outskirts of Hangzhou, and was a metal presser at the Hangzhou Meter Factory for more than twenty years. He had no previous criminal record, according to investigators. Investigators reported that Tang was distraught over family problems. A colleague who knew Tang said that he had "an unyielding mouth", "grumbled a great deal", and was "very cynical". Another former co-worker said Tang 'had a quick temper and was always complaining about society". 

Police report that Tang went through his second divorce in 2006 and grew increasingly despondent when his 21-year-old son started getting into trouble. The son was detained in May 2007 on suspicion of fraud, then received a suspended prison sentence in March 2008 for theft.

Aftermath 
US Olympic Committee Chairman Peter Ueberroth and US President George W. Bush each offered their condolences. The United States Embassy issued a statement, that argued that as the Chinese tour guide was also hurt in the attack, it was not specifically aimed at Americans and was not related to the Olympics. US Ambassador Clark T Randt visited the victims while they were being treated.

Shortly after the attacks, the tower was closed to tourists with the surrounding area still open to tourists. Chinese officials increased the police presence with 110,000 officers and 1.7 million volunteers stationed near the Olympics to alleviate safety concerns. Beijing Olympic official Wang Wei, announced that there would be extra security checks implemented at some scenic areas, and large outdoor screens used to view the games around Beijing were muted or turned off to avoid large crowds.

References

External links
USAToday article

Attacks in China in 2008
2008 Summer Olympics
American people murdered abroad
Deaths by stabbing in China
Murder–suicides in China
Mass stabbings in China
2000s in Beijing
Crime in Beijing
China
Stabbing attacks in 2008